Michael Brewer (born April 14, 1944, in Oklahoma City, Oklahoma) is an American musician. He and Tom Shipley were the popular music duo Brewer & Shipley.

Brewer formed a duo in Los Angeles during early 1966 named Mastin & Brewer with singer/songwriter Tom Mastin. The group recruited drummer Billy Mundi and bass guitar player Jim Fielder for live performances, opening for The Byrds and Buffalo Springfield during spring 1966. When Mastin ended his employment abruptly during sessions for an album, Brewer enlisted his brother Keith and the pair recorded a lone single 45 for Columbia Records company, "Need You", backed by "Rainbow" (written by Tom Mastin and Brewer before the former's departure). Mundi became employed with The Lamp of Childhood and then The Mothers of Invention while Fielder had also joined The Mothers of Invention (and later Buffalo Springfield and Blood, Sweat & Tears). After recording the single, Brewer met his old friend Tom Shipley and they initiated a duo together.

During 1983, Brewer released an LP, Beauty Lies, to which Dan Fogelberg was the producer. The album has never been released on CD.

References 

Brewer and Shipley.com – Michael Brewer Bio

1944 births
Living people
Musicians from Oklahoma City
American male singers
Singers from Oklahoma